Checkatrade.com is the trading name of Vetted Ltd and a subsidiary of HomeServe. The site operates as a directory of vetted and recommended tradespeople. It was founded by Kevin Byrne BCAb and originally headquartered in Selsey, West Sussex, before moving to Portsmouth, Hampshire in 2019, following its acquisition by HomeServe.

History 
Checkatrade, originally founded as "Scout", was established in September 1998 by local resident Kevin Byrne after rogue traders descended on Selsey following a localised tornado. Byrne set up Scout as a printed directory of local tradespeople whom he had personally vetted to complete jobs in the Selsey area.

Byrne soon changed the company name to "The Trade Register", but a government rule later forbidding the use of the word ‘register’ in a company name saw the change to "Checkatrade" in 2005. Checkatrade has been registered with Companies House as Vetted Ltd since 2001.

In February 2017, HomeServe acquired a 40% stake in Checkatrade, holding an option to extend that to 75% within the following 2 years. By November 2017 HomeServe had acquired the remaining 60% for a further £54m. In 2018, Mike Fairman was appointed as CEO.

Checkatrade relocated to Portsmouth during 2019. As of March 2019, Checkatrade employed over 400 people and had 36,000 vetted trade members.

Awards 
In 2014 the Checkatrade website won a Queen's Award for Enterprise, being commended in the Innovation category. Later in 2014 Checkatrade was recognised by The Times in their "Britain’s Best Small Companies to Work For" awards.

Partnerships 
A number of UK councils' trading standards departments have previously partnered with Checkatrade including Nottinghamshire, East Sussex, Suffolk, Kent, Surrey and Buckinghamshire. After an elderly woman was targeted by con men in Kent, resulting in her losing over £1,000, the Police issued a recommendation that residents use tradespeople in the Kent County Council trading standards approved trader scheme, created in conjunction with Checkatrade.

Sponsorships 
Checkatrade were the primary sponsor of the English Football League Trophy, from the 2016/17 season to the 2018/19 season. The Checkatrade Trophy involves clubs from League One and League Two, plus 16 under-21 teams from the Premier League and EFL Championship clubs.

Between 2013 and 2018 the Broadfield Stadium, home of Crawley Town FC, was renamed "The Checkatrade.com Stadium" as part of a sponsorship deal.

In early 2018 Checkatrade became sponsor of the PDC darts tournaments.

Checkatrade.com were the sponsor of ITV National Weather in 2018.

References

External links 
 

Internet properties established in 1998
Computer companies of the United Kingdom
Companies based in West Sussex
Companies based in Hampshire
British companies established in 1998